Devil Monster (1936) is an American adventure film directed by S. Edwin Graham. The working title of the film was The Great Manta and it was shown in Great Britain as The Sea Fiend in 1938. Also, a Spanish-language version entitled El diablo del mar, directed by Juan Duval using some of the same actors and footage, was released in the United States in 1936 by Cinexport Films.

An edited version of the film was released in 1946 as Devil Monster, a low-budget South Seas drama spiced up with stock footage inserts including half-dressed native girls who were also featured in the film's trailer. The Hays Code, which banned nudity in American films, apparently tolerated partial nudity in "ethnographic" scenes of "native" life. This version of the film is now in the public domain and is available online at Internet Archive.

Cast 
Barry Norton as Robert Jackson
Blanche Mehaffey as Louise
Jack Barty as Capt. Jackson
Terry Grey as Tiny
Jack Del Rio as Jose Francisco
Mary Carr as Mother of Jose
William Lemuels as Native Chief
Maya Owalee as Maya
Donato Cabrera as Malo

See also
 List of films in the public domain in the United States
 List of monster movies

References

External links 

The Sea Fiend (1936) at IMDB
Devil Monster (1946) at IMDB

El diablo del mar (1936) at IMDB

1935 films
1930s adventure films
American black-and-white films
Films set in Oceania
American multilingual films
Seafaring films
Giant monster films
American monster movies
American natural horror films
American adventure films
Adventure horror films
1935 multilingual films
1930s English-language films
1930s American films